"The Ghost at Number One" is a song by the American power pop group Jellyfish. It is the first single released in support of their 1993 album Spilt Milk.

Track listings 
European 7-inch single (CUSS 10)
"The Ghost at Number One" (edit) – 3:25
"All Is Forgiven" – 4:10

European CD1 single (CUSDG 10)
"The Ghost at Number One" (edit) – 3:25
"All Is Forgiven" – 4:10
"Worthless Heart" – 3:07
"Ignorance Is Bliss" – 3:58

European CD2 single (CUSCD 10)
"The Ghost at Number One" (edit) – 3:25
"All Is Forgiven" – 4:10
"Watchin' the Rain" – 4:10
"Family Tree" – 4:10

Charts

References

External links 
 

1993 singles
1993 songs
Charisma Records singles
Jellyfish (band) songs
Song recordings produced by Albhy Galuten
Song recordings produced by Jack Joseph Puig
Songs written by Andy Sturmer
Songs written by Roger Joseph Manning Jr.